The Stratus Seekers is an album by George Russell released in May or June 1962 on Riverside Records. The album contains performances by Russell with John Pierce, David Baker, Paul Plummer, Don Ellis, Steve Swallow and Joe Hunt.

Reception
In his review in the August 16, 1962 of Down Beat magazine Harvey Pekar says this of Russell: "His work abounds with such devices as polyphony, polytonality, and changing tempos and time signatures. He is also a brilliant orchestrator... producing constantly varying sonorities and textures." A retrospective  Allmusic review by Scott Yanow states that "The music has its own logic, is somewhat difficult to classify, yet deserves further attention by jazz historians and analysts".

Track listing
All compositions by George Russell except where noted.
 "Pan-Daddy" - 4:57  
 "The Stratus Seekers" - 6:52  
 "The Stratus Seekers" [alternate take] - 7:44 Bonus track on CD reissue  
 "Kige's Tune" (Al Kiger) - 5:46  
 "Blues in Orbit" - 7:24  
 "A Lonely Place" - 7:18  
 "Stereophrenic" (David Baker) - 5:11  
Recorded January 31, 1962 in NYC

Personnel
George Russell: piano, arranger, conductor
Don Ellis: trumpet
David Baker: trombone
Paul Plummer: tenor saxophone
John Pierce: alto saxophone
Steve Swallow: bass
Joe Hunt: drums

References

1962 albums
George Russell (composer) albums
Riverside Records albums
Albums produced by Orrin Keepnews
Albums arranged by George Russell (composer)
Albums conducted by George Russell (composer)